Pape Avenue Cemetery, officially known as Holy Blossom Cemetery, is the first Jewish cemetery in the city of Toronto, Canada. The small cemetery is now closed to new burials, and is mostly hidden within the residential neighbourhood of Leslieville.

It was established in 1849 by two prominent local businessmen Judah G. Joseph and Abraham Nordheimer (uncertain if Joseph is buried here, while Nordheimer died during his trip to Germany in 1862 and is buried at Bamberg Jewish Cemetery). At the time the nearest Jewish cemeteries were in Montreal or Buffalo, and Joseph was concerned for his fatally ill son Samuel, who eventually became the first burial in the new cemetery. The location near the corner of Pape (then called Centre Road) and Gerrard was then in still rural areas to the east of the city. It was not close to much of the Jewish community, but was a convenient location to purchase.

It was one of the first Jewish institutions established in Toronto, being opened some years before the city's first synagogue. When Toronto Hebrew Congregation, the predecessor to Holy Blossom Temple, was established in 1856, it took over management of the cemetery, and continues to run it today. Over the next decades almost all the early founders of Toronto's Jewish community would be buried there.

The small Pape Avenue Cemetery quickly ran out of room, and it was closed to new burials in the 1930s.

Jones Avenue Cemetery

In 1883 the nearby Jones Avenue Cemetery opened at 480 Jones Avenue in Riverdale, serving the members of Beth Tzedec Congregation's two predecessor synagogues.

Holy Blossom Memorial Park

To replace it, Holy Blossom opened a new cemetery further east at 66 Brimley Road in the Cliffcrest area of Scarborough, Ontario.

Notable burials at Holy Blossom Memorial Park:

 Frank Shuster (1916-2002) and Johnny Wayne (1918-1990) - comedians
 Bora Laskin (1912-1984) - 14th Chief Justice of Canada
 Saul Laskin (1918-2008)- 1st Mayor of Thunder Bay
 Nathan Phillips  (1892-1976) - 52nd Mayor of Toronto
 Alex Levinsky (1910-1990) - NHL hockey player
 Murray Koffler (1924-2017) - pharmacist, businessman, founder of Shoppers Drug Mart

References

Jewish cemeteries in Toronto
Jews and Judaism in Toronto
1849 establishments in Canada